The antitragicus is an intrinsic muscle of the outer ear.

In human anatomy, the antitragicus arises from the outer part of the antitragus, and is inserted into the cauda helicis (or tail of the helix) and antihelix.

The function of the muscle is to adjusts the shape of the ear by pulling the antitragus and cauda helicis towards each other. While the muscle modifies the auricular shape only minimally in the majority of individuals, this action could increase the opening into the external acoustic meatus in some.

The helicis minor is developmentally derived from the second pharyngeal arch.

Additional images

See also
 Intrinsic muscles of external ear

References

External links
 AnatomyExpert.com

Ear
Muscles of the head and neck